Vernetta Lesforis (born 4 May 1975) is a Saint Lucian sprinter who specialized in the 400 metres.

Lesfrois attended Missouri Valley College.

She won the gold medal at the 1999 Central American and Caribbean Championships in a career best time of 52.21 seconds. She also competed at the 2000 Olympic Games without reaching the final round.

References

1975 births
Living people
Saint Lucian female sprinters
Athletes (track and field) at the 2000 Summer Olympics
Olympic athletes of Saint Lucia
Missouri Valley College alumni
Athletes (track and field) at the 1999 Pan American Games
Pan American Games competitors for Saint Lucia